Estonia has participated at the European Athletics Championships since the inaugural 1934 year, but after the country was invaded and occupied by the Soviet Union in 1940, Estonia didn't participate until it regained independence. Since 1994, Estonia has participated in every championship.

Summary

Medalists
As of 2018.

Statistics
As of 2018.

Youngest competitor
Men: Marek Niit – 19 years 3 days – 4x100m – 2006
Women: Kätlin Piirimäe – 18 years 280 days – shot put – 2014

Youngest medalist
Rasmus Mägi – 22 years 103 days – 400m hurdles – 2nd – 2014

Oldest competitor
Men: Gerd Kanter – 39 years 94 days – discus throw – 2018
Women: Eha Rünne – 39 years 73 days – discus throw – 2002

Oldest medalist
Gerd Kanter – 37 years 64 days – discus throw – 3rd – 2016

See also
 Estonia at the World Championships in Athletics

References

External links
 European Athletic Association
 Eesti Kergejõustikuliit

 
Nations at the European Athletics Championships
Athletics in Estonia